Camera-Marugo-Cohen syndrome, also known as Obesity, mental retardation, body asymmetry and muscle weakness syndrome is a very rare genetic disorder which is characterized by familial obesity, intellectual disabilities, body asymmetry, and muscular weakness. It is a type of syndromic obesity/obesity syndrome. 2 cases have been reported in medical literature (there were three, but one of the patients was found to have diploid mixoploidy.)

Etiology 
This disorder was discovered in 1993 by Camera et al., when they described a patient with short stature, intellectual disability, hypogonadism, micropenis, camptodactyly, and cleft lip/palate. They came to the conclusion that this was a novel post-natal obesity syndrome.

A second case report was published by Lambert et al. in 1999, whey described 2 un-related patients with generalized obesity, "mental retardation", body asymmetry, muscle weakness, retrognathia, blepharoptosis, hyperlordosis, deviation of the hallux, syndactyly, and camptodactyly.

A comment left in 2001 on the case report described by Lambert et al. (made by no other than Lambert et al. themselves) updated the two patient case report: one of the patients were found to have diploid/triploid mixoploidy, the second patient and the patient described by Camera et al. were unavailable for karyotyping.

References 

Genetic diseases and disorders